The Federal Ministry of Health and Social Affairs was a government ministry in the Federal Republic of Germany from 22 October 2002 to 18 October 2005. It was formed with during the first Government of Angela Merkel and dissolved with the Second Gerhard Schröder Cabinet. The function of the ministry was then transferred to the Federal Ministry of Health and the Federal Ministry of Labour and Social Affairs.

Ulla Schmidt was the only head of the ministry.

References

Medical and health organisations based in Germany
Federal government ministries of Germany